The discography of Slovak recording artist Celeste Buckingham consists of three studio albums, one compilation and fourteen singles, including three featuring her contribution. In addition to, she has appeared on twelve music videos, has two other appearances as well a number of unreleased songs.

Musically, Buckingham received her initial exposure at the age of fifteen, after being cast in the TV reality show Česko Slovenská SuperStar (2011); based on UK Pop Idol. However failed to earn the title, she managed to appear on the themed compilation Výběr finálových hitů, issued on May 9, 2011 by Universal Music. The soundtrack featuring vocal performances by the finalists of the talent series, peaked at number sixteen on the local albums chart, including also two compositions recorded by herself. While one of those served as her own cover version of a Stone's hit ("You Had Me"), the other was the album's hymn tune and ensemble track, "Nevzdávám". Following that, singer began collecting a material for her full-length record.

Her debut solo single, "Blue Guitar", arrived shortly through iTunes. Released on July 20, 2011,  the song promptly cracked the Hot 50 of the component radio chart in her homebase country at number seven, reaching on the overall Top 100 list at number thirty-eight. Subsequently on November 7, Buckingham scored another success. This time, though, in favor of a R&B mid-tempo called "Nobody Knows", accompanied with a music video. The work originally crafted as support for the VA compilation F84 to raise awareness of autism, climbed to number four on the Hot 50 in SK and to number seven in CZ, respectively. Meanwhile, her name was also credited on "Ja a ty", a duet delivered for the album Nový človek by male rapper Majk Spirit. After signing a distribution deal with EMI Records, her debut album Don't Look Back saw its eventual release on April 3, 2012.

Albums

Studio albums

Soundtracks

Singles

As lead artist

As featured artist

Other appearances

Unreleased songs

Videos

Music videos

See also
 List of number-one songs (Slovakia)
 List of number-one songs (Czech Republic)
 The 100 Greatest Slovak Albums of All Time

References 
General

Specific

External links

 Celeste Buckingham (official website)
 
 Celeste Buckingham on Belmont University
 Celeste Buckingham on Discogs
 Celeste Buckingham on FundAnything

 Celeste Buckingham on Mladá fronta DNES
 
 Celeste Buckingham at iREPORT.cz
 Celeste Buckingham at SuperMusic.sk

Discography
Pop music discographies